Narendra Modi, the 14th Prime Minister of India, has elicited a number of public perceptions regarding his personality, background and policies.

Perception through the years
Journalist Ashis Nandy, who is also a trained psychologist, was one of the first to interview Modi when the latter was an RSS pracharak (missionary) at the height of the Ram Janmabhoomi campaign in the early 1990s. At that time in Modi, he found "a classic, clinical case of a fascist".

Soon after becoming the chief minister of Gujarat, the state was convulsed by sectarian riots in 2002.The complicity of Modi's government in the pogrom against the Muslim minorities made Modi a pariah for many years. The United States and many European countries imposed visa bans on  Modi after the riots. These remained in force for many years and were lifted shortly before he became prime minister in 2014

After the Gujarat riots, Modi embarked on a strategy to make the state a friendly place to set up business and rebrand his image from being a Hindu hardliner to a development oriented leader. This led to him being dubbed as Vikaspurush (Development man). This was the main theme during his successful campaign in 2014.

In September 2013 Modi was named the BJP's candidate for prime minister ahead of the 2014 Lok Sabha election. Several BJP leaders initially expressed opposition to Modi's candidature, including BJP founding member L. K. Advani. Contrary to the strategies used  by the party during previous elections, Modi played the dominant role in the BJP's presidential style election campaign. The 2014 election campaign was the first time he declared that he was married but had remained estranged from his wife, Jashodaben almost from the beginning of their married life. Upon the disclosure, lawsuits were filed against him for forging previous election documents as against prescribed rules of the Representation of the People Act.

Modi has for years presented himself as an able administrator with an eye for detail. But his  reputation as a  vigilant administrator started to lose its shine in 2016 when his notorious demonetisation policy caused distress to  millions of Indians who largely relied on cash.Some critics termed this as "Tughlakifarman" (Tughlak's diktat) after Mohammed Tughlaq, the 14th century erratic  sultan of Delhi. His reputation took a further hit  in March 2020 when he imposed a complete lockdown in the country at four hours notice to stop the spread of COVID-19. This led to millions losing their jobs and many lost their lives. The Indian economy also shrunk in percentage terms by double digit numbers. For foreign observers, his nationalist impulses are always paired with a sense of technocratic competence. But according to Christopher Clary, assistant professor of political science at the State University of New York, technocratic competence has been entirely missing from his response to the second wave of the COVID-19 pandemic in India in early 2021.

Right at the beginning of the Covid pandemic in March 2020, Modi set up the PM CARES Fund with himself, and his senior cabinet colleagues, namely the ministers of defence, home, and finance as the trustees of the fund.The Government of India had initially claimed that the fund is a private fund, and denied that the PM CARES Fund is a public fund for the purposes of transparency laws such as the Right to Information Act 2005, even though the Fund uses government infrastructure and the national emblem of the Government of India. The total amount of funds donated and the names of donors have not been publicly disclosed, and the fund is privately audited. The lack of transparency and accountability has been  continuously criticized.– In December 2020, the Government of India reversed its stance and admitted that the PM CARES Fund was a public fund, but still refused to disclose information regarding it under the Right to Information Act 2005. Modi was criticized for hiding out of view when the deadly second wave of Covid hit India in April 2021. Modi observers noted that he has a tendency to shy away from bad news when faced with a turmoil.

Although India is a parliamentary democracy, Modi has a penchant for passing laws with minimum or no debate in the two houses of Parliament. The controversial farm reform laws were passed with less than three hours of debate in either house in September 2020. After a year long protests, Modi in November 2021 repealed the laws in three minutes in the Lok Sabha and nine minutes in the Rajya Sabha. In both cases, without any discussion.

Communication strategies
Modi has been an early adopter of communication technology since his days as the chief minister of Gujarat.In 2007 he hired  Washington based APCO, one of the largest PR and lobbying firm in the world to help with his communication strategy.  Modi has used multiple strategies to build up his image. These include use of Social media, government media outlets, and a distinct attire. The  machinery for this works also includes ad makers, speechwriters and assorted spinners managing Modi's image and campaigns. During his years in power as the prime minister, Modi has made it sure that his images appear everywhere including on billboards, newspaper and TV advertisements, and vaccine certificates. Modi's picture on the government issued Covid vaccine certificate has riled many people in India. In criticizing it, Mamata Banerjee, the chief minister of West Bengal demanded Modi's picture to be on death certificates too. Modi also uses a messianic tone in his speeches such as saying that his leadership qualities came from God.

Social media
One of the main strategies used by Narendra Modi and his government has been the extensive use of Social media to directly communicate with the public. In September 2014 Modi became the second-most-followed leader in the world with 5 million Twitter followers. Modi's 31 August 2012 post on Google Hangouts made him the first Indian politician to interact with the public on live chat. Modi was the second-most-followed leader in the world (with over 30 million followers on Twitter, as of June 2017 behind only Barack Obama. For the 2014 elections, The BJP's  National Digital Operations Centre (NDOC) led a group of volunteers for the social media campaign. The volunteers were charged with trolling and attacking mainstream journalists considered unfavorable to Modi. The group was headed by Arvind Gupta. Gupta joined the team in 2009 and for 2014 election campaign, he was in charge of websites, uploading videos of rallies and meetings, distributing them to media houses, and posting comments and releases and trolling opponents online.

There has been concern over misinformation and fake news being spread on social media platforms, particularly on WhatsApp, by the BJP under Modi.

Mann ki Baat

Modi's use of social media has been at the expense of traditional media such as Television and print media. He rarely gives interviews or holds a press conference. Since coming to power in 2014, Modi has also been hosting a monthly monologue called Mann Ki Baat on the government owned All India radio and Doordarshan. His supporters applaud the use of an old fashioned  medium like radio to promote positive social causes while his detractors call it another propaganda tactic by Modi to reach out to millions of  people untouched by the internet.

Media intimidation
Modi has been called a controversial, polarising and divisive figure by many media sources. There are reports that Modi and his government are highly anxious to avoid negative media attention. Journalists and public figures have lost their jobs following criticism of Modi. In January 2023, the Modi led Indian government ordered YouTube and Twitter to block links to a BBC documentary India: The Modi Question critical of Modi's handling of 2002 Gujarat riots.

Personal appearance 
{{Quote box
 |quote  = God has gifted me the sense of mixing and matching colours. So I manage everything on my own. Since I’m God gifted I fit well in everything. I have no fashion designer but I’m happy to hear that I dress well.
 |source = Narendra Modi, in The Modi Effect by Lance Price| width = 22em
}}

Modi has used his choice of clothes at different occasions to make visual statements. Simona Vittorini says that like Mahatma Gandhi, Modi experiments in clothing. As a populist leader he uses his choice of clothes to appeal and identify with the people, show his outsider or  anti-elite credentials, and project a strong leadership. He likes to  project an image of the saviour of Hindu India. This was seen in  his appearances in 2020 at foundation stone ceremonies at Ayodhya and the  New parliament building in New Delhi where he  donned safron color  outfits and presided over various Hindu religious rituals. Modi has been careful in how his images appear since his days as the chief minister of Gujarat.He always avoids raising his right palm because that is the symbol of the Indian Congress party. He also avoids the color green because that is associated with islam and also black. Modi donned safron robes with a flowing beard  at the end of the election campaign in May 2019, when he travelled to a mountain cave in the Himalayas at Kedarnath for meditation. He was heavily mocked by national and international media  for conducting his meditation (tapasya in Sanskrit) in a cave that  had an attached toilet, a heater, a bathing area, an electric geyser, a telephone, WiFi, and a grand view. A cameraperson was allowed to record the session.

Earlier Modi had been called a fashion leader in India, and his clothing choices were discussed internationally. The type of vest regularly worn by Modi have become popular, and called as Modi Jackets. Modi's usual attire is a kurta and a vest, and his half-sleeve kurta is sometimes called the Modi Kurta. Modi's clothes are made of silk or cotton, are crisply ironed and are handmade in Gujarat. When he was chief minister he wore bold, bright colours, changing to pastels as prime minister. For holidays, Modi wears a traditional turban from wherever he is. Some of his clothing has been created by Bollywood fashion designer Troy Costa.

In January 2015 while receiving United States President Barack Obama in a state visit at the Hyderabad House, Modi wore a suit with his name embroidered repeatedly in the pinstripes. Modi claimed that the suit was gifted to him. Modi's political opposition criticized his wearing the suit, complaining that he campaigns on an image of coming from a poor background and living without money while at the same time wearing luxury products such as this suit. Other commentators said that in choosing this suit Modi was being a parvenu, at the height of vanity, going to a ridiculous extreme, and political opposition party leader Jairam Ramesh said that he was a megalomaniac. Journalist Siddharth Varadarajan commented on the public support for the auction by saying "the manner in which Mr. Modi's leadership has been projected is extremely unhealthy in any democratic society". The making of the suit was done free of cost by Jade Blue, however he still managed to auction the suit for US$695,000 and contributed the entire amount for Clean Ganga project.

In 2009, Modi's clothing was said to be Bollywoodesque and indicative of Gujarat's modernism. According to Vogue India editor Priya Tanna in a New York Times blog, "Never before has there been such a strong convergence between what a politician in India stands for and his clothing." Tanna called his clothing choice "100% India": democratic, supportive of Indian industry (separating him from politicians in Western suits), emblematic of his humble birth, clean and hygienic. Responding to Tanna, another commentator said that Modi's fashion choice has no particular meaning and there is no need to interpret it.

56-inch chest
One of the strategies that Modi and his handlers have used to project his "Hero" status is his "56-inch Chest". Although a masculine attribute, the 56-inch chest seems to have garnered him support from female voters. Author Manjima Chatterjee claims  that Modi's perceived decisiveness makes him a sex symbol for women. His detractors, however, lampoon this attribute or try to demolish the myth by saying that it is only 44 inch.

Charity
Modi donates generously  for different government related schemes.
Auctioning of all the gifts he received as the Chief Minister of Gujarat raised  crore.All the proceeds from the auction were donated to the Kanya Kelavani Fund for girls education. After becoming the prime minister, he has ordered the proceeds of gift auctions to go for causes ranging from Girl Child Education to Clean Ganga campign, and the welfare of underprivileged.These donations have now exceeded .Although most of  money for the donations came from auctioning  of the gifts he has received as a government official, some it came his personal savings. The ethics of his auctioning of gifts that he received as a government official without depositing them with the exchequer has been subjected to criticism.

Yoga

After promoting Yoga in his 2015 address to the UN, Modi has been holding the International Day of Yoga celebrations every year on 21 June, the day of Northern Summer solstice.

 Popularity and influence 

In a nationwide survey concerning Indian Chief Ministers, Modi was named Best Chief Minister in 2007 by India Today. 
In March 2012 Modi appeared on the cover of the Asian edition of Time, one of the few Indian politicians to have done so, and made the 2014 Time 100 list of the world's most influential people. He has become the most followed Asian leader on Twitter, and in 2014 was ranked the 15th-most-powerful person in the world by Forbes. In 2015, Modi was one of Times "30 most influential people on the internet" as the second-most-followed politician on Twitter and Facebook. In 2015, Modi was ranked 5th on Forbes'' magazine's list of 'World's Greatest Leaders'.
I
n November 2017, a survey of Pew Research Center showed Modi to be the "by far" most popular figure in Indian politics. In this survey Modi at 88% was ahead of Rahul Gandhi (58%), Sonia Gandhi (57%) and Arvind Kejriwal (39%).

Modi  was featured in a cover story written by journalist and novelist, Aatish Taseer in a Time magazine article titled "India's divider in chief" in the May 20, 2019 issue. This was followed by an article, in the same magazine, written by Modi's  British advisor, Manoj Ladwa titled, "Modi united India like no PM in decades" in the May 30, 2019 issue of Time magazine.

Criticism and controversies

Under Modi's tenure, India has experienced democratic backsliding. His administration introduced the Citizenship Amendment Act, Abrogation of Article 370, NRC which resulted in widespread protests across the country. Described as engineering a political realignment towards right-wing politics, Modi remains a figure of controversy domestically and internationally over his Hindu nationalist beliefs and his alleged role during the 2002 Gujarat riots, cited as evidence of an exclusionary social agenda.

Reporters Without Borders in 2021 characterised Modi as a predator for curbing press freedom in India since 2014. In January 2023, Modi government banned the BBC documentary India: The Modi Question which criticised him.

References

Notes

Citations

References
 
 

Narendra Modi
Modi, Narendra